Charles Howard, 3rd Earl of Carlisle, PC (c. 1669 – 1 May 1738) was a British nobleman, peer, and statesman.

Charles Howard was the eldest son of Edward Howard, 2nd Earl of Carlisle, and inherited his title on the death of his father in 1692. He married in 1683 Lady Anne de Vere Capell, daughter of Arthur Capell, 1st Earl of Essex.

Political career
He was elected as MP for Morpeth in 1689, with a London home in Soho Square. He was appointed Governor of Carlisle from 1693 to 1728 and Lord-Lieutenant of Cumberland and of Westmorland from 1694 to 1714. William III made him a Gentleman of the Bedchamber between 1700 and 1702, First Lord of the Treasury from 1701 to 1702 and Privy Counsellor in 1701. He acted as Earl Marshal between 1701 and 1706 because his cousin, the Duke of Norfolk, was a minor. On Anne, Queen of Great Britain's death on 1 August 1714 he was appointed Lord Justice of the Realm until the arrival of King George I of Great Britain on 18 September 1714. The new king reappointed him as First Lord of the Treasury from 23 May 1715 to 10 October 1715 and made him Constable of the Tower of London between 1715 and 1722.

Business dealings
From 1699 to 1709 Carlisle was involved with the fraudulent schemes of pirate John Breholt. First Carlisle backed a plan to dive on and salvage a supposed wreck off Havana - Breholt even named his ship Carlisle - which came to naught, after which Breholt let slip that he intended to sail for Cape Verde and then to Madagascar to engage in outright piracy. A few years later Carlisle backed Breholt's plan (presented directly to Queen Anne) to pardon the pirates of Madagascar and have them return to England with their collected wealth. This scheme fell apart when Breholt's pirate past was exposed.

Personal life
In 1699 he commissioned a new Baroque mansion, Castle Howard, in Yorkshire, England to the design of Sir John Vanbrugh which is still occupied by his descendants.

He died in Bath in 1738 and is buried in the mausoleum at Castle Howard. He had six children:

 Henry Howard, 4th Earl of Carlisle (1693–1758)
 General Sir Charles Howard (c. 1696–1765)
 Lady Harriet Howard, died young
 Lady Elizabeth Anne Howard, married Nicholas Lechmere, 1st Baron Lechmere, then Sir Thomas Robinson, 1st Baronet
 Lady Anne Howard, married Rich Ingram, 5th Viscount of Irvine, then Brig-Gen. William Douglas of Kirkness (d. 1747)
 Lady Mary Howard, unmarried

References

 
 
 

1669 births
1738 deaths
Charles Howard, 3rd Earl of Carlisle
03
Lord-Lieutenants of Cumberland
Lord-Lieutenants of the Tower Hamlets
Lord-Lieutenants of Westmorland
Members of the Privy Council of England
Members of the Privy Council of Great Britain
English MPs 1689–1690
English MPs 1690–1695